Carnteel) is a hamlet, townland and civil parish, about 2 miles northeast of Aughnacloy in County Tyrone, Northern Ireland. It is situated in the historic barony of Dungannon Lower.

Carnteel Village
The village is situated 14 kilometres southwest of Dungannon, close to the B35 Dungannon to Aughnacloy Road, with a hilltop location, focused around a crossroads at its centre and with the ruins of an historic church. It is largely made up of housing, with a large agricultural machinery business to the north, and other facilities limited to a shop and post office.

Carnteel Parish
In 1837 Carnteel Parish, situated on the River Blackwater, had a population of 7,459 people (including those in Aughnacloy) and covered 13,432 acres. It was mountainous, with some bog, in the north of the parish and there was extensive quarrying. Most people were engaged in agriculture with some linen and cotton weaving.

The church at Carnteel was destroyed in the Irish Rebellion of 1641 and replaced with a church at Aghaloo, itself replaced after the building of a church in Aughnacloy in 1736.

The Parish contains the townlands of:

Annagh Beg
Armalughey
Aughnacloy
Ballynapottoge
Belragh
Branny
Carnteel
Castletown
Cavan Oneill
Cavankilgreen
Commons
Corderry
Cranslough
Cravenny Irish
Cravenny Scotch
Dernabane
Dernaborey
Derrycreevy
Derrycush
Doolargy
Drone
Drumaslaghy
Edentiloan
Garvey
Glack
Glenroe
Golan
Inishmagh
Killyneery
Knockadreen
Knocknarney
Leany
Legaroe
Lisadavil
Lisbeg
Lisconduff
Lisdoart
Lisginny
Loughans
Martray
Mullaghbane
Mullaghnese
Plaister
Ravellea
Reskatirriff
Rousky
Shanalurg
Shantavny
Skey
Tirelugan
Tully
Tullyvar
Tullywinny
Tulnavern

Carnteel Townland

The townland is situated in the historic barony of Dungannon Lower and the civil parish of Carnteel and covers an area of 235 acres.

The population of the townland declined during the 19th century:

The townland contains one Scheduled Historic Monument: a Church (grid ref: H6944 5460).

See also
List of civil parishes of County Tyrone
List of townlands of County Tyrone

References

Villages in County Tyrone
Townlands of County Tyrone